Coleophora halimodendri is a moth of the family Coleophoridae. It is found in Kazakhstan.

The larvae feed on Halimodendron halodendron. They feed on the leaves and flower buds of their host plant.

References

halimodendri
Moths described in 1989
Moths of Asia